Jailhouse Rock is a 1957 American musical drama film directed by Richard Thorpe and starring Elvis Presley, Judy Tyler, Mickey Shaughnessy, Vaughn Taylor and Jennifer Holden. Adapted by Guy Trosper from a story written by Nedrick Young, the film tells the story of Vince Everett (Presley), a convict who learns the guitar while in prison and later becomes a star following his release.

The film's iconic soundtrack was written by songwriters Mike Stoller and Jerry Leiber. The dance sequence to the film's title song is often cited as "Presley's greatest moment on screen."

Jailhouse Rock premiered in Memphis, Tennessee on October 17, 1957, and was released nationwide on November 8, 1957. It peaked at #3 on the Variety box-office chart and finished #14 for the year, grossing $4 million. The film initially earned mixed reviews, with much of the negative targeted at Presley. In 2004, the film was selected for preservation in the National Film Registry by the Library of Congress, who deemed it "culturally, aesthetically or historically significant."

Plot 
Construction worker Vince Everett accidentally kills a drunken, belligerent man in a barroom brawl and is sentenced to 10–14 months in the state penitentiary for manslaughter. His cellmate, washed-up country singer Hunk Houghton, in jail for bank robbery, teaches Vince a few guitar chords. Hunk then convinces Vince to participate in an inmate show that is broadcast on nationwide television. After his appearance, Vince receives many fan letters, but the jealous Hunk prevents their delivery.

Hunk convinces Vince to sign a pact to become equal partners in his act when they are both free. Later, during an inmate riot in the mess hall, a guard shoves Vince, who retaliates by striking the guard. As punishment, the warden orders Vince to be lashed with a whip. Vince later learns that Hunk attempted to bribe the guards to forgo the punishment but did not have enough money.

Upon Vince's release 14 months later, the warden gives him his withheld fan mail from the TV show. Hunk promises Vince a singing job at a nightclub owned by a friend, where Vince meets Peggy Van Alden, a promoter for pop singer Mickey Alba. Vince is surprised when the club owner denies him a job as a singer but offers him a job as a bar boy. To prove himself to the club owner, Vince takes the stage to sing when the house band takes a break, but a customer laughs obnoxiously throughout the performance, enraging Vince, who smashes his guitar and leaves the club. Peggy then persuades Vince to record a demo so that he can listen to himself sing. Vince records "Don't Leave Me Now," and Peggy takes the tape to Geneva Records. The manager seems unimpressed, but he reluctantly agrees to play the tape for his boss in New York. The next day, Peggy informs Vince that the song has been sold. Later, Peggy takes Vince to a party at her parents' home, but Vince leaves after he offends a guest whom he mistakenly believes is belittling him. Angry and offended, Peggy confronts Vince, who kisses her brutally. Peggy resentfully calls the gesture "cheap tactics," to which Vince replies, "They ain't tactics, honey; it's just the beast in me." Later, Vince and Peggy are shocked to discover that Geneva Records gave the song to Mickey Alba, who recorded and released the song, thereby stealing Vince's song. Infuriated,  Vince storms into the label's office and confronts the manager, violently slapping him around.

To avoid a similar misfortune, Vince convinces Peggy to form their own label, which they name Laurel Records, and hire an attorney named Mr. Shores to oversee the business. Vince then records "Treat Me Nice" and begins pitching it, but the song is universally rejected. However, Peggy convinces her friend Teddy Talbot, a disc jockey, to air the song, and it becomes an immediate hit. Vince asks Peggy out to celebrate but is disappointed to learn that she had already accepted a dinner date with Teddy.

Later, Vince makes arrangements for another television show. At a party, Hunk, who has been granted parole, persuades Vince to give him a part in the upcoming show in an effort to revive his own music career. Prior to taping, Vince rehearses "Jailhouse Rock" in a stylized cell block. But Hunk's number is cut because of his outdated music style. Vince later informs Hunk that the pact that they had signed in prison is worthless. However, indebted to Hunk for having tried to bribe the prison guards, Vince offers Hunk a job with his entourage.

Vince soon becomes a major star. However, Peggy no longer speaks with Vince, as his success has made him arrogant. Vince signs a movie deal, and the studio head asks him to spend the day with his conceited costar Sherry Wilson for publicity purposes. Sherry then falls in love with Vince after shooting a kissing scene.

Hunk grows tired of Vince's egotism. Peggy appears unexpectedly to discuss business. At the same time, Mr. Shores approaches Vince with an offer from Geneva Records to purchase Laurel Records and sign him to a rich contract. Peggy refuses to sell and is devastated when Vince wants to close the deal anyway. Enraged by Vince's attitude and treatment of Peggy, Hunk starts a fight with Vince and strikes him in the throat, endangering Vince's voice and singing ability. At the hospital, Vince forgives Hunk and realizes that he loves Peggy and that she loves him. Vince's doctor later informs him that his vocal cords are fully recovered, and in the living room, Vince tests his voice by singing "Young and Beautiful" to Peggy to confirm that his singing voice is intact and his worries are unfounded before the two put their arms around each other for comfort as the film ends.

Cast 
 Elvis Presley as Vince Everett, an ex-con who becomes a singing star. Producer Pandro S. Berman's wife convinced him to make a film with Presley in the leading role. Presley's manager, Colonel Thomas Parker, was only interested in the film's score and the rights to record sales and publishing royalties, and Presley was paid $250,000 and 50% of the film's royalties.
 Judy Tyler as Peggy Van Alden, a music promoter who helps Vince build his career and becomes his lover. Tyler was previously known for her part as Princess Summerfall Winterspring on the television show Howdy Doody and as Suzy in the Broadway musical Pipe Dream (1955). Tyler took a three-month leave of absence from Howdy Doody to shoot the film. Tyler and her husband were killed in a car crash on July 3, just days after production was completed and before its premiere. Presley was so devastated that he refused to watch the film.
 Mickey Shaughnessy as Hunk Houghton, Vince's cellmate and a former country singer. He teaches Vince the guitar and later becomes Vince's assistant. Shaughnessy was known as Leva in From Here to Eternity (1953). He was also a comedian, and Variety reported that Shaughnessy had performed a 45-minute routine deriding Presley sometime before the film was made. Elaine Dundy, author of the book Elvis and Gladys (1985), considered his selection an "odd choice" and the result of Berman's lack of involvement with casting.
 Vaughn Taylor as Mr. Shores, an attorney whom Vince and Peggy hire to manage Vince's financial affairs.
 William Forrest as the studio head (uncredited)
 Jennifer Holden as starlet Sherry Wilson. The film was Holden's debut; after auditioning for the role at MGM in May 1956, she was selected immediately. She studied drama with Lillian Roth and had previously appeared on stage.
 Dean Jones as disc jockey Teddy Talbot. Jones was formerly a blues singer, and he was coached for the role by disc jockeys Ira Cooke and Dewey Phillips. Jones went on to star in a string of Walt Disney films.
 "Jailhouse Rock" cowriter Mike Stoller (of the Leiber and Stoller songwriting partnership) and Presley's regular band during that period—Scotty Moore, Bill Black and D. J. Fontana—appear as Vince's band throughout the film, though uncredited.

Production
Jailhouse Rock was Presley's third film and his first for MGM. It was filmed at MGM Studios (now Sony Pictures Studios) in Culver City, California. Filmed in black-and-white, the film was the first MGM production to use the recently developed 35 mm anamorphic lens by Panavision. The film was originally titled The Hard Way and was changed to Jailhouse Kid before MGM finally settled on Jailhouse Rock. The film was not listed with the studio's planned releases for the year because it was based on a story by Nedrick Young, a blacklisted writer. During production, producer Pandro Berman was more focused on another of his productions, the 1958 film The Brothers Karamazov. He allowed studio head Benny Thau and William Morris Agency president Abe Lastfogel to select the cast. Richard Thorpe, who had a reputation for quickly finishing projects, was chosen to direct the film.

The first scene filmed was the title dance sequence to the song "Jailhouse Rock." Presley was not initially pleased with the direction of choreographer Alex Romero, so Romero asked Presley to try his own moves to for the final sequence. The scene has often been cited as Presley's greatest musical moment on screen.  Filming began on May 13, 1957 with the newly created choreography.

Presley's characteristic hairstyle and sideburns were covered with a wig and makeup for the musical and jail scenes. During the performance, one of Presley's dental caps detached and became lodged in his lung, and he spent a night in the hospital before filming resumed the next day.

Thorpe, who usually filmed scenes in a single take, finished the film by June 17, 1957.

Soundtrack

Before production began, rock-and-roll songwriting partners Jerry Leiber and Mike Stoller were commissioned to create the film's soundtrack, but they did not send any material to MGM for months. In April 1957, the studio summoned the writers to New York and Jean Aberbach, director of the Hill & Range music publishing company, confronted them demanding to see the songs. When told that there was no material, Aberbach locked the songwriters in their hotel room and would not allow them to leave until they had written songs. Four hours later, Leiber and Stoller had written "I Want to Be Free", "Treat Me Nice", "(You're So Square) Baby I Don't Care", and "Jailhouse Rock."

Presley recorded the finished songs at Radio Recorders in Hollywood on April 30 and May 3, 1957, with an additional session at the MGM soundstage in Hollywood on May 9 for "Don't Leave Me Now." Leiber and Stoller were invited to the recording session of April 30, where they met Presley, who convinced MGM to cast Stoller as the band's pianist in the film. During filming, Presley mimed the words for film's musical numbers, and the music was later added to the finished scenes. 

The following songs in the film were performed by Presley unless otherwise noted:

 "One More Day" (Sid Tepper, Roy C. Bennett) – performed by Mickey Shaughnessy
 "Young and Beautiful" (Abner Silver, Aaron Schroeder)
 "I Want to Be Free" (Jerry Leiber, Mike Stoller)
"Don't Leave Me Now" (Aaron Schroeder, Ben Weisman)
 "Treat Me Nice" (Jerry Leiber, Mike Stoller)
 "Jailhouse Rock" (Jerry Leiber, Mike Stoller) – dance routine choreographed by Elvis Presley
 "(You're So Square) Baby I Don't Care" (Jerry Leiber, Mike Stoller) - Presley also played electric bass

Release

Jailhouse Rock premiered on October 17, 1957 at Loews State Theater in Memphis. Female lead Judy Tyler had been killed in an automobile accident soon before the film's release, and a devastated Presley did not attend the premiere. The film opened nationally on November 8.

Box office
The film peaked at #3 on the Variety box-office chart and reached #14 for the year.

According to MGM records, the film earned $3.2 million in the U.S. and Canada and $1,075,000 elsewhere during its initial theatrical run, resulting in a profit of $1,051,000.

In 1957, Presley was ranked the fourth-leading box-office commodity in the film industry. According to Variety, by 1969, Jailhouse Rocks gross income in the U.S. and Canada was comparable to that of The Wizard of Oz (1939).

Critical reception

Jailhouse Rock earned mixed reviews from critics. Some felt it scandalous when released because it portrayed Vince Everett as an antiheroic character, presented a convict as a hero, used the word "hell" as a profanity and included a scene with Presley in bed with Tyler. The Parent-Teacher Association described the film as "a hackneyed, blown-up tale with cheap human values." The New York Times criticized Guy Trosper for writing a screenplay in which the secondary characters were "forced to hang on to the hero's flying mane and ego for the entire picture." Cue magazine called the film "[an] unpleasant, mediocre and tasteless drama."

Some publications criticized Presley. Time panned his onstage personality, while The Miami News compared the film with horror pictures and wrote, "Only Elvis Presley and his 'Jailhouse Rock' can keep pace with the movie debut of this 'personality,' the records show. In estimating the lasting appeal of their grotesque performer." Jazz magazine Down Beat wrote that Presley's acting was "amateurish and bland." British magazine The Spectator described Presley's evolution from his "silly" performance in Loving You to "dangerously near being repulsive."

Other reviewers responded positively to the film. Louise Boyca of The Schenectady Gazette wrote that "it's dear Elvis that gets the soft focus camera and the arty photography." Boyca remarked upon the low production costs of the film, and said that Presley was "in top singing and personality form." The Gadsden Times said, "Elvis Presley not only proves himself as a dramatic actor ...  but also reveals his versatility by dancing on the screen for the first time. The movie ... also contains Elvis' unique style of singing."
Look favored the film, describing how one audience "registered, loud and often, its approval of what may accurately be described as the star's first big dramatic singing role."

Author Thomas Doherty wrote in his 2002 book Teenagers and Teenpics: The Juvenalization of American Movies in the 1950s: "In Jailhouse Rock, the treatment of rock 'n' roll music, both as narrative content and as cinematic performance is knowing and respectful ... The elaborate choreography for the title tune, the long takes and uninterrupted screen time given to the other numbers, and the musical pacing—the rock 'n' roll builds in quality and intensity—all show an indigenous appreciation of Presley's rock 'n' Roll." Critic Hal Erickson of AllRovi wrote that the film "is a perfect balance of song and story from beginning to end." Mark Deming, also of AllRovi, wrote that Jailhouse Rock was "one of [Presley's] few vehicles which really caught his raw, sexy energy and sneering charisma on film."

The review aggregate website Rotten Tomatoes lists the film with an overall 81% "Fresh" approval rating based on 16 reviews.

Accolades
In 1991, Jerry Leiber and Mike Stoller were awarded with an ASCAP Award for Most-Performed Feature Film Standards for the song "Jailhouse Rock". In 2004, Jailhouse Rock was selected for preservation in the United States National Film Registry, as it was deemed "culturally, historically, or aesthetically significant." The film is famous for the dance sequence (also choreographed by Presley) in which Presley sings the title track while on stage, cavorting with other inmates through a set resembling a block of jail cells. The sequence is widely acknowledged as the most memorable musical scene in Presley's 30 narrative films, and is credited by some music historians as the prototype for the modern music video. Jailhouse Rock ranked 495th on Empires 2008 list of the 500 greatest films of all time.

The film is recognized by American Film Institute in these lists:
 2004: AFI's 100 Years...100 Songs:
 "Jailhouse Rock" – #21
 2006: AFI's Greatest Movie Musicals – Nominated

Notes

See also
 List of American films of 1957

Footnotes

References

Books

Journals

Other

External links

 Jailhouse Rock essay by Carrie Rickey on the National Film Registry website 
 Jailhouse Rock essay by Daniel Eagan in America's Film Legacy: The Authoritative Guide to the Landmark Movies in the National Film Registry, A&C Black, 2010 , pages 535-536 
 
 
 
 
 

1957 films
1950s musical drama films
1950s teen films
American musical drama films
American romantic drama films
American romantic musical films
American rock music films
American black-and-white films
Articles containing video clips
1950s English-language films
Films about singers
Films based on songs
Films set in prison
Metro-Goldwyn-Mayer films
Films directed by Richard Thorpe
Films produced by Pandro S. Berman
United States National Film Registry films
1957 drama films
Films shot in Los Angeles County, California
1950s American films